West End station is a DART Light Rail station in Dallas, Texas. It is located in the West End Historic District of Downtown Dallas on Pacific Avenue, between Market and Lamar Streets near CBD West Transfer Center.

This is the westernmost stop on the four stop trunk segment shared by all four lines. West of here, approaching the TRE tracks, the Orange and Green Lines branch north and the Red and Blue Lines branch south.

Following the shooting of Dallas police officers on July 7, 2016, the station was closed during the investigation of the nearby crime scene. Trains were stopping at all transit mall stations except West End, which they passed through during the incident. News outlets reported that ridership was lower than normal just after the attacks at nearby stations such as Akard, St. Paul, and Pearl/Arts District, typically busy stations during the morning rush hour.

References

External links
 Dallas Area Rapid Transit - West End Station

Dallas Area Rapid Transit light rail stations in Dallas
Railway stations in the United States opened in 1996
1996 establishments in Texas
Railway stations in Dallas County, Texas